Tanya Nicole Kach-McCrum (born October 14, 1981) is an American woman who was held captive for ten years by a security guard who worked at the school she attended. Her captor, Thomas Hose, eventually pleaded guilty to involuntary deviant sexual intercourse and other related offences and was sentenced to five to fifteen years in prison. Ultimately, he ended up serving the full 15 years.

Captivity
Thomas Hose was a security guard at Cornell Middle School in McKeesport, Pennsylvania, where Kach was an eighth-grade student. Hose befriended Kach, often taking her out of classes to talk to her, and one day when he caught her skipping class, he kissed her. Over time, Hose convinced Kach to run away from her family and move in with him, which she did in February 1996. She was 14 years old at the time.

For the first four years, she was not allowed out of the house. Hose lived with his parents and son, and went to great lengths to keep Kach hidden from them. She was confined entirely to his second-story bedroom, and had to go to the toilet in a bucket. In 2000, Hose created a new identity for Kach, "Nikki Allen", and introduced her to his parents as his girlfriend who would be moving in with them. After this, she was occasionally allowed to leave the house but had a strict curfew. Six years later, she escaped.

Escape and later life
After being allowed some time outside of the house, Kach began to realize that her relationship with Hose was not normal. She escaped from captivity on March 21, 2006, with the help of Joe Sparico, a grocery store owner in her neighborhood whom she had befriended, by revealing her true identity to him and asking him to send police to the house. In 2007, Hose pled guilty to three counts of involuntary deviant sexual intercourse, aggravated indecent assault, statutory sexual assault, interfering with the custody of a child, corruption of a minor and child endangerment. Hose was sentenced to a maximum of 15 years in prison and was released in 2022, subsequently registering as a sex offender.

Kach was happy to be reunited with her family, but has since become estranged from her father. Through her marriage in September 2018, she has a stepdaughter and stepson and is grandmother to her stepson’s young children.

Since her escape, Kach attempted to sue numerous government organizations for their failing of her, including the police and school board. All were dismissed. She has also written a New York Times bestselling book titled Memoir of a Milk Carton Kid: The Tanya Nicole Kach Story.

See also
List of kidnappings
List of solved missing person cases

References

1981 births
1990s missing person cases
1996 crimes in the United States
21st-century American women
American memoirists
American women memoirists
Crimes in Pennsylvania
Formerly missing people
History of women in Pennsylvania
Incidents of violence against girls
Kidnapped American children
Living people
Missing person cases in Pennsylvania
People from Pittsburgh
Place of birth missing (living people)